Curtimorda bisignata is a species of beetle in the family Mordellidae. It was described by Ludwig Redtenbacher in 1849.

References

Mordellidae
Beetles described in 1849